Jonathan Gregory "J.D."  Davis, nicknamed Dizzie (born April 27, 1993) is an American professional baseball third baseman and left fielder for the San Francisco Giants of Major League Baseball (MLB). He played college baseball at California State University, Fullerton, and was drafted by the Houston Astros in the third round of the 2014 Major League Baseball draft. He made his MLB debut with the Astros in 2017, and has also played for the New York Mets.

Amateur career
Davis attended Elk Grove High School in Elk Grove, California. The Tampa Bay Rays selected him in the fifth round of the 2011 Major League Baseball draft. 

Davis did not sign and attended California State University, Fullerton, where he played college baseball for the Cal State Fullerton Titans from 2012 to 2014. Davis played first base and was also a pitcher. In his three years with the Titans, he hit .307/.394/.461 with 14 home runs and 113 runs batted in (RBIs) in 156 games. As a pitcher he had a 3.00 earned run average (ERA) and 11 saves. In 2013, he played collegiate summer baseball for the Chatham Anglers of the Cape Cod Baseball League (CCBL), where he was named East Division MVP of the league's annual all-star game.

Professional career

Houston Astros
After his junior season, Davis was drafted by the Houston Astros in the third round of the 2014 Major League Baseball draft. He signed with the Astros for $748,600 and made his professional debut with the Tri-City ValleyCats. After hitting .293/.371/.508 with a .878 on-base plus slugging (OPS) in 111 at bats over 30 games, he was promoted to the Quad Cities River Bandits of the Class A Midwest League, where he finished the 2014 season, batting .303/.363/.516(9th in the Midwest League) with eight home runs and 32 RBIs in 155 at bats. He was named an MiLB Organization All Star.

In 2015, he played for the Lancaster JetHawks of the Class A-Advanced California League. There Davis slashed .289/.370/.520 with 93 runs (3rd in the league), 26 home runs (6th), 101 RBIs (2nd; behind Cody Bellinger), 54 walks (3rd), 157 strikeouts (3rd), 12 grounded into double plays (4th), and 10 hit by pitch (2nd). 

In 2016, Davis played for the Corpus Christi Hooks of the Class AA Texas League. There, he led the league with 34 doubles and batted .268/.334/.485(10th in the Texas League) with 61 runs (8th), 23 home runs (3rd), 81 RBIs (3rd), and 45 walks (8th), and 143 strikeouts (3rd). He was named an MiLB Organization All Star.

Davis began 2017 back with Corpus Christi, batting .279/.340/.510(8th in the Texas League) with 21 home runs (2nd), and 60 RBIs. He was promoted to the Fresno Grizzlies of the Class AAA Pacific Coast Leaguein July where he batted .295 with five home runs, 18 RBIs, and a .993 OPS in 16 games. He was named an MiLB Organization All Star.

The Astros promoted Davis to the major leagues on August 5, 2017. He played 25 games with the Astros with 62 at bats, with a .226 batting average, four home runs, and seven RBIs. The Astros finished the year with a 101–61 record, and eventually won the 2017 World Series. Davis did not play in the playoffs, but was still on the Astros 40-man roster, giving him a chance to win his first career championship.

On March 24, 2018, the Astros announced that Davis had made the Opening Day roster. He batted .175 with one home run in 103 at bats for the Astros. He batted .342(5th in the Pacific Coast League)/.406/.583(6th) with 17 home runs with 81 RBIs (6th) for Fresno in 333 at bats. He was named an MiLB Organization All Star.

New York Mets
On January 6, 2019, the Astros traded Davis and Cody Bohanek to the New York Mets for Ross Adolph, Luis Santana, and Scott Manea. On August 26, 2019, Davis was awarded with the MLB Play of the Week with an over-the-shoulder basket catch by MLB.com.  He finished the 2019 season batting .307/.369/.527 with career-highs in home runs (22) and RBIs (57) in 140 games. He was in the top 5% in the MLB in average exit velocity. His four assists were the 5th-most for an NL left fielder. In the field, he played 79 games in left field, and 31 games at third base.

Davis played in 56 games for the Mets in 2020, slashing .247/.371/.389 with 6 home runs and 19 RBIs. The 8 double plays he grounded into were 5th-most in the National League, and his 7 hit by pitch were 6th-most in the league. In the field, he played 34 games at third base, and 11 in left field.

On June 25, 2021, Davis was placed on the 60-day injured list with a left hand sprain. On July 16, Davis was activated off of the injured list. In 38 at bats with Class AAA  Syracuse he batted .316. In 2021 with the Mets he batted .285/.384/.436. In the field, he played all his games at third base.

On March 22, 2022, Davis signed a $2.76 million contract with the Mets, avoiding salary arbitration.

In 2022 with the Mets, before he was traded, he batted .238/.324/.359 with 4 home runs and 21 RBIs, in 181 at bats. He played 43 games at DH, 12 at third base, and four at first base.

San Francisco Giants
On August 2, 2022, Davis and pitchers Carson Seymour, Nick Zwack, and Thomas Szapucki were traded to the San Francisco Giants for first baseman/outfielder Darin Ruf. 

With the Giants, he batted .263/.361/.496 in 137 at bats, with 20 runs, 8 home runs, and 14 RBIs. With the Giants he played 18 games at third base, 14 each at first base and DH, and 2 in left field. In 2022 he was in the top 5% in MLB in hard-hit percentage (56.1%), barrel percentage, and average exit velocity on balls hit (92.4 mph).

On January 13, 2023, Davis agreed to a one-year, $4.21 million contract with the Giants, avoiding salary arbitration.

References

External links

Cal State Fullerton Titans

1993 births
Living people
Sportspeople from Elk Grove, California
Baseball players from California
Major League Baseball third basemen
Houston Astros players
New York Mets players
San Francisco Giants players
Cal State Fullerton Titans baseball players
Tri-City ValleyCats players
Quad Cities River Bandits players
Lancaster JetHawks players
Glendale Desert Dogs players
Corpus Christi Hooks players
Fresno Grizzlies players
Chatham Anglers players
Syracuse Mets players
Wisconsin Woodchucks players